The Seaglider is a deep-diving Autonomous Underwater Vehicle (AUV) designed for missions lasting many months and covering thousands of miles. In military applications the Seaglider is more commonly referred to as an Unmanned Underwater Vehicle (UUV).

Seaglider was initially developed by the University of Washington. iRobot received an exclusive five-year license to produce the Seaglider for customers outside the University of Washington in June 2008. 
May 2013 Kongsberg Underwater Technology, Inc. (part of Kongsberg Maritime) announced that they have completed negotiations with the University of Washington's Center for Commercialization to obtain the sole rights to produce, market and continue the development of Seaglider ™ technology.

Systems
Seaglider measures temperature, salinity and other quantities in the ocean, sending back data using global satellite telemetry. Seaglider UUVs are in use worldwide, collecting oceanic physical properties and performing various other missions for oceanographers, including the U.S. Navy, government agencies and research organizations.

Seaglider "flies" through the water with extremely modest energy requirements using changes in buoyancy for thrust coupled with a stable low-drag hydrodynamic shape. Designed to operate at depths up to 1,000 meters the hull compresses as it sinks to match the pressure from the seawater.

Missions
In May 2010 Seaglider was deployed in the Gulf of Mexico to help monitor and gather data during the Deepwater Horizon oil spill incident.

In 2013 the US Navy tested Seaglider for use in the Littoral combat ship.

As of 2016, the US Navy was deploying LBS-Glider from T-AGS and was preparing to deploy from DDGs.

See also
 Liquid Robotics#Wave Glider

References

External links
  Seaglider Spec sheet
 Seaglider website

Autonomous underwater vehicles
IRobot
2000s robots